Weyand is a surname. Notable people with the surname include:

Alex Weyand (1891–1982), American football player
Frederick C. Weyand (1916–2010), American general
Sabine Weyand (born 1964), German EU official
Uta Weyand, German pianist